Charles II of Alençon, called the Magnanimous (1297 – 26 August 1346) was Count of Alençon and Count of Perche (1325–1346), as well as Count of Chartres and Count of Joigny (1335–1336) as husband of Jeanne of Joigny.

Life
Charles was the second son of Charles of Valois and his first wife Margaret, Countess of Anjou, and brother of Philip VI of France. In April 1314 he married Jeanne of Joigny, who succeeded her father John II as Countess of Joigny in 1335, but she died on 2 September 1336. They had no children. Charles made his debut in Guyenne under the orders of his father and showed great courage at his first siege.

On the death of his father on December 16, 1325, Charles received the county of Alençon, the lands of Champrond, Châteauneuf-en-Thymerais and Senonches, as well as the forest of Perche, in accordance with an agreement made by his father.

His brother Philip became King of France in 1328, but Edward III of England claimed the crown and refused to do homage. Philip appointed Charles lieutenant general of the kingdom and sent him to put down a rebellion in Saintes, sparked by the English. He captured Saintes and several other strongholds.

Engagement, marriages and issue
According to an agreement from July 1308, signed in Serbia between his father and the King of Serbia, Charles II was initially engaged to marry King's daughter, Princess Zorica of Serbia, but, as her father sabotaged the mission of the Papal legates sent into Serbia, Charles of Valois pulled out.

In April 1314, he was married firstly to Jeanne, Countess of Joigny (d. 1336), daughter of Jean II, Count of Joigny (b. 1277) and his wife, Agnès de Brienne (1285). They didn't have children.

In December 1336, after the death of his first wife, he married secondly Maria de La Cerda y Lara (1310 – 19 November 1379, Paris), the daughter of Fernando de la Cerda, Lord of Lara. They had:

 Charles III, Count of Alençon (1337 – 5 July 1375, Lyon), made Archbishop of Lyon in 1365.
 Philippe of Alençon (1338–1397, Rome), made Bishop of Beauvais in 1356, later Cardinal, Archbishop of Rouen, Latin Patriarch of Jerusalem, Patriarch of Aquileia, and Bishop of Ostia and Sabina
 Peter II, Count of Alençon (1340 – 20 September 1404), married Marie Chamaillart, Viscountess of Beaumont-au-Maine.
 Isabelle of Alençon (1342 – 3 September 1379, Poissy), became a nun.
 Robert of Alençon, Count of Perche (1344–1377),, married on 5 April 1374 Jeanne of Rohan, daughter of John I, Viscount of Rohan.

Death
Charles entered the War of the Breton Succession in 1340, and was subsequently killed at the Battle of Crécy. Like his father, he was buried in the now-demolished church of the Couvent des Jacobins in Paris; his effigy is now in the Basilica of St Denis.

He was succeeded in Alençon by his eldest son Charles, and in Perche by his son Robert.

Arms

Ancestry

References

Sources

1297 births
1346 deaths
People of the Hundred Years' War
House of Valois-Alençon
Counts of Alençon
Counts of Perche
Counts of Joigny
French military personnel killed in action
14th-century peers of France